Nathaniel Teed is a Canadian politician, who was elected to the Legislative Assembly of Saskatchewan in a by-election on September 26, 2022. He represents the district of Saskatoon Meewasin as a member of the Saskatchewan New Democratic Party caucus.

He is the province's first openly gay MLA.

References 

Saskatchewan New Democratic Party MLAs
Politicians from Saskatoon
Canadian LGBT people in provincial and territorial legislatures
Gay politicians
Living people
Year of birth missing (living people)
Canadian gay men